The 1963–64 season was Stoke City's 57th season in the Football League and the 33rd in the First Division.

With the club now on a high after gaining promotion back to England's top tier, Tony Waddington wasted no time in bringing in new signings to make sure relegation was avoided. He broke the transfer record and despite some concern during the season Stoke stayed up comfortably in 17th position. Stoke enjoyed success in the League Cup reaching the final against Leicester City before losing 4–3 over two legs.

Season review

League
With the euphoria of winning promotion over, Waddington knew that his side had to be strengthened to have any hope of surviving in the First Division. The first big name signing he made was that of Peter Dobing for a club record fee of £37,500 from Manchester City and £6,000 for Bobby Irvine a young goalkeeper from Linfield. Also signed by Stoke this season was John Ritchie a centre forward signed from non-league Kettering Town for a small fee of £2,500. Ritchie scored 30 goals in his first season and went on to become Stoke's best ever goalscorer.

Stoke made a dream start to the 1963–64 season beating Tottenham Hotspur 2–1 at home on the opening match of the season, Jimmy McIlroy scoring both goals, and then accounting for Aston Villa 3–1 two days later. There followed though, a run of 10 matches without a win and Stoke found themselves at the wrong end of the table. Waddington was not happy with his defence and went out and bought Calvin Palmer from Nottingham Forest for £30,000 and George Kinnell from Aberdeen for £27,000 and another 'keeper Lawrie Leslie from West Ham United. On the other hand, he released Don Ratcliffe, and Ron Wilson. John Ritchie was introduced into the first team by October and he made an instant impression as he started scoring the first few of his 171 for the club. With Ritchie in full flow, things improved and in nine matches from early October to mid November, Stoke remained unbeaten. However around Christmas time the team again went through a bad spell losing eight times including some heavy defeats.

Stoke recovered well in the second half of the season and began to pull themselves away from the danger zone. A huge 9–1 win over Ipswich Town in March gave the team the confidence they needed and five wins in their last nine fixtures lifted Stoke to a final position of 17th, 10 points above relegated Bolton Wanderers.

FA Cup
Stoke beat Portsmouth 4–1 in the third round and then edged past Ipswich in a replay before losing in a replay to Swansea.

League Cup
Away from the league Stoke had a great run in this seasons League Cup having made an unspectacular start to the competition which started in 1960. In 1963–64 they made it through to the final where they met Leicester City. Stoke's run had seen them knock-out Scunthorpe United after three matches, Bolton Wanderers, Bournemouth, Rotherham United and then Manchester City in the semi final. The final itself was played over two legs, Stoke drawing 1–1 at the Victoria Ground in the first clash. This proved to be insufficient as Leicester won the return leg at Filbert Street 3–2 giving them a 4–3 aggregate win and with it the League Cup.

Final league table

Results

Stoke's score comes first

Legend

Football League First Division

FA Cup

League Cup

Friendlies

Squad statistics

References

Stoke City F.C. seasons
Stoke